Mölbling is a municipality on the Gurk River in the district of Sankt Veit an der Glan in the Austrian state of Carinthia.

Geography
Mölbling lies about 27 km northeast of Klagenfurt. The Gurk runs through the eastern edge of the municipality.

The commune comprises the Katastralgemeinden of Dielach, Gunzenberg, Meiselding, Rabing, and Rastenfeld.

Politics
Seats in the municipal assembly (Gemeinderat) as of 2009 elections:
 Alliance for the Future of Austria (FPK): 11 
 Social Democratic Party of Austria (SPÖ): 3 
 Austrian People's Party (ÖVP): 1

Personalities
In 1893 the Austrian chemist Carl Auer von Welsbach acquired Rastenfeld Castle as his private residence, where he died in 1929.

References

Cities and towns in Sankt Veit an der Glan District